BC Avtodor, commonly known as simply Avtodor and internationally as Avtodor Saratov, is a Russian professional basketball club based in Saratov. It plays in the FIBA Europe Cup and in the VTB United League, the highest level of Russian basketball. In early 2022, after the 2022 Russian invasion of Ukraine, Americans D. J. Funderburk and Grant Jerrett and Canadians Kenny Chery and Philip Scrubb left the team.

History

Establishment and growth (1960–1992)
Founded in 1960 as Spartak Saratov, former player Vladimir Rodionov became its head coach in the 1982. The club was later renamed into Avtodorozhnik (road engineer) - shortened to Avtodor in 1996 - in reference to a late benefactor.

Scaling the heights (1992–2004)
Joining the Russian League at its creation in 1992, the club competed with CSKA Moscow (being the first club to defeat them in the league) for national supremacy during the rest of the decade, finishing in second place four times between 1994 and 1999.

It would win the regular season in both 1997 and 1998, but lost both finals series against CSKA 2–3, and 1–3 respectively.

The Russian outfit regularly took part in European competitions during that period, reaching the semifinals of the 1998 second-tier EuroCup and playing in the 1999 top-tier EuroLeague (exiting at the first group stage).

Avtodor defeated CSKA in the 2001–02 playoff quarterfinals, the only team to have prevented the Army men from reaching the top four in Russian basketball history to this day.

Demise and rebuilding (2004–2014)

After threatening to do so for years because of disputes with the local administration, especially regarding the lack of a convenient arena, Rodionov moved the organisation to Saint Petersburg during the 2004 summer. He would form Dynamo Saint Petersburg, transferring some of Avtodor's best players such as Vladimir Veremeenko, and 
its place in the Super League.

Meanwhile, a cash-strapped Avtodor voluntarily relegated itself to the second division for 2004–05, fielding an noncompetitive side made of youngsters, before moving down to the third division in 2005. Avtodor would win the second division in 2009 but did not have the financial means to return to the Super League. It did return to the Super League in 2012 but by that time the league had become the domestic second division. Winning that league in 2014, in large part thanks to the play of league MVP Courtney Fortson and promising youngster Artem Klimenko, the club received an invitation to play in the top-tier VTB United League and the European third-tier EuroChallenge for 2014-15.

The club was able to fund its participation thanks to increased support from the local administration, who reduced the funding of the city's ice hockey club Kristall Saratov to compensate.

Back at the top (2014–2019)

After losing seven of its first nine VTB League games, Avtodor regrouped with the help of November acquisition Kyrylo Fesenko and the play of December league MVP Fortson (who had no problem adapting to the league) to contend for a playoffs place. Despite three coaching changes, with Vladimir Antsiferov replaced by his assistant Sergey Mokin in late October before Rodionov fired Mokin and took the coaching reins himself on 3 March 2015, the club reached the EuroChallenge quarterfinals where they lost to Trabzonspor.

In the league, Avtodor beat major sides CSKA Moscow, Khimki Moscow Region, Lokomotiv Kuban Krasnodar and Unics Kazan to reach the playoffs, though they lost three contested games against Khimki to exit at the quarterfinal stage.

2020-present
In early 2022, after the 2022 Russian invasion of Ukraine, Americans D. J. Funderburk and Grant Jerrett and Canadians Kenny Chery and Philip Scrubb left the team.

Arena

Avtodor formerly played in the Yunost arena, seating only a few hundred and unable to accommodate television broadcasts, which meant the side had to play its European games in Moscow. During the 1997–98 season, the club played its regular-season games in the Yunost arena before moving for its playoffs games to an indoor-football arena whilst a new arena was being refurbished.

It moved to the newly reopened 1,500 seat Zvezdny Sports Palace in May of that year, though this arena also proved too small as 2,000 fans packed the venue during a 21 May 1998 game against CSKA (albeit the league title decisive game), with some hanging from the balcony.

Calls for the club to move in the larger Kristall Arena (an ice hockey arena built in 1969), were finally heeded in 2014.  Avtodor remodeled the arena for basketball play, which also raised the capacity from 5,450 to 6,100 seats, playing their first game there on November 11.

Honours

Domestic competitions
Russian First Division
Runners-up (4): 1994, 1997, 1998, 1999
Regular season champions (2): 1997, 1998
Russian Second Division
Champions (2): 2009, 2014

Season by season

Current roster

Notable players 

2020s
  Evgeny Kolesnikov 4 seasons: '15–'17, '21–
  Nikita Mikhailovskii 5 seasons: '17–'21, '22–
  Kenny Chery 1 season: '21–'22
  Jaron Johnson 1 season: '21–'22

2010s
  Justin Robinson 1 season: '17–'18
  Coty Clarke 1 season: '17–'18
  Nick Minnerath 1 season: '16–'17
  Artem Zabelin 4 seasons: '15–19
  Kyrylo Fesenko 1 season: '14–'15
  Courtney Fortson 2 seasons: '13–'15
  Ivan Strebkov  seasons: '13–'14
  Artem Klimenko 3 seasons: '12–18

2000s
  Semyon Antonov 3 seasons: '06–'09
  Artem Zabelin 3 seasons: '03–'07, '15-present
  Yaroslav Korolev 1 season: '03–'04
  Beno Udrih 1 season: '03–'04
  Vladimir Veremeenko 2 seasons: '02–'04
  Nikita Morgunov  season: '02
  Kebu Stewart 1 season: '01–'02
  Victor Khryapa 2 seasons: '00–'02
  Sergei Monia 2 seasons: '00–'02

1990s
  Andrei Fetisov 1 season: '98–'99
  Sergei Chikalkin 1 season: '98–'99
  Grigorij Khizhnyak 1 season: '98–'99
  Roberts Štelmahers  season: '98
  Julius Nwosu  season: '98
  Darius Lukminas 2 seasons: '96–'98
  Evgeniy Pashutin 4 seasons: '95–'99
  Zakhar Pashutin 4 seasons: '95–'99
  Gintaras Einikis 4 seasons: '95–'99
  Vitaly Nosov 1 season: '92–'93

Notes

References

External links
 
VTB United League profile Retrieved 25 August 2015
Eurocup profile Retrieved 25 August 2015
Eurobasket.com profile Retrieved 25 August 2015

1960 establishments in Russia
Basketball teams established in 1960
Basketball teams in Russia
Basketball teams in the Soviet Union
Sport in Saratov